The Murphy-Burroughs House, also known as the Burroughs Home and Gardens, is a historic home in Fort Myers, Florida. It is located at 2505 1st Street. On August 1, 1984, it was added to the U.S. National Register of Historic Places.

The Burroughs Home provides living history tours and functions as an event venue. The three-story home sits on the Caloosahatchee. The beautiful veranda wraps around 3 sides of the house. Mona's Dancing Porch extends from the East side of the Historic Structure. Completion of a large, open waterfront pavilion occurred in 2015 to accommodate weddings and events.

The Murphy-Burroughs House was Ft. Myers' first year-round luxury home. It is in the Georgian Revival style and was built in 1901 for John T. Murphy, a cattle rancher. The construction of this home kicked off the "building boom" of the area. Each step of the process was followed by the local newspaper, The Fort Myers Press.

Nelson Burroughs bought the house in 1919. In 1922, Mr. Burroughs transferred ownership of the Home to his daughters, Mona & Jettie. Mona bequeathed the property to The City of Fort Myers prior to her death in 1978. The passing of her husband, Franz Fischer, in 1983, marked the end of its use as a residence.

References

External links

 Burroughs Home.com - Website
 Florida's Office of Cultural and Historical Programs
 Lee County listings
 Murphy Burroughs House
 Uncommon Friends Foundation - Non-profit organization tasked with maintaining Home & Property

Houses on the National Register of Historic Places in Florida
National Register of Historic Places in Lee County, Florida
Georgian Revival architecture in Florida
Museums in Lee County, Florida
Historic house museums in Florida
Houses in Lee County, Florida
Buildings and structures in Fort Myers, Florida
Tourist attractions in Fort Myers, Florida
Houses completed in 1901
1901 establishments in Florida